Onchidoris loveni is a species of sea slug, a dorid nudibranch, a shell-less marine gastropod mollusc in the family Onchidorididae. This species is found in the north-eastern parts of the Atlantic Ocean.

Distribution
This species was described from Bantry Bay, County Cork, Ireland. It is currently known from Sweden and Norway.

References

Onchidorididae
Gastropods described in 1862